Lycée Alfred Kastler may refer to:
 Lycée Alfred Kastler de Cergy-Pontoise
 Lycée Alfred Kastler - Dourdan
 Lycée Alfred Kastler - Guebwiller
 Lycée Alfred Kastler - Talence